The Army Police are the Military Police of the Brazilian Army. Their history dates back to 1944.

In the Brazilian Army, the Military Police is a specialty of Infantry. The operational units are battalions and companies.

Members of the Brazilian Military Police identified by the use of helmet and black brassards with the letters "PE" in white (or blue-collar and white helmet with red letters).

Duties

The activities undertaken by the PE are as follows:

 Ensure compliance with the law, orders, and compliance with military regulations; 
 Prevent crime
 Perform routine investigations in the Army;
 Traffic police and staff;
 Traffic control in military areas;
 Security of military installations and offices ;
 Escort of senior officials and military convoys;
 Safety and security of  military and civilian personnel;
 Criminal investigations;
 Guard prisoners at the disposal of military justice;
 Skill variety:
 scientific examinations;
 expert report of traffic accident;
 examinations in firearms;
 expert report on the projectile from a firearm, and
 examination of gunpowder residue;
 simulated reproduction of facts;
 technical report describing the scene;
 expert report Papiloscopia;
 expert report of assessment material. 
 Control Disorders;
 Evacuation, control and custody of a prisoner of war;
 Arrest of deserters and escaped prisoners;
 Control of movement of civilian traffic;
 Escort convoys;
 Control of the area of public calamity, and
 Rear area security and occupation in case of war.

Army Police units

See also
 Military Police
 Army Police (Portugal)
 Batalhão de Polícia do Exército (Brasil)
 Polícia Aérea
 Polícia Naval
 Polícia Judiciária Militar
 Polícia da Aeronáutica
 Companhia de Polícia do Batalhão Naval

Notes

External links
Official site of the 2º Batalhão de Polícia do Exército (2nd PE Bn
Official site of the 3º Batalhão de Polícia do Exército (3rd PE Bn)
Official site of the 4º Batalhão de Polícia do Exército (4th PE Bn)

Brazilian Army
Brazil
Military police of Brazil
1944 establishments in Brazil